The year 1832 in architecture involved some significant architectural events and new buildings.

Buildings and structures

Buildings opened
 January – Theatre Royal, Wexford, Ireland (demolished 2006)

Buildings completed

 Church of Our Saviour, Qaqortoq, Greenland.
 Cutlers' Hall, Sheffield, England, designed by Samuel Worth and Benjamin Broomhead Taylor.
 Drapers' Hall, Coventry, England, designed by Thomas Rickman.
 Surgeons' Hall, Edinburgh, Scotland, designed by William Henry Playfair.
 Replacement Old City Gaol, Bristol, England, designed by Richard Shackleton Pope.
 Osgoode Hall, Toronto for The Law Society of Upper Canada, designed by John Ewart and W. W. Baldwin.
 Royal City of Dublin Hospital, Ireland, designed by Albert E. Murray.
 Cathedral of the Holy Trinity, Gibraltar.
 Hill's Academy, Essex, Connecticut.
 Maderup Mølle, Funen, Denmark (now in The Funen Village)
 Théâtre des Folies-Dramatiques, Paris.
 The Mount, Sheffield, England (residential terrace), designed by William Flockton.
 Staines Bridge (across the River Thames in England), designed by George Rennie.
 Marlow Bridge (suspension, across the River Thames in England), designed by William Tierney Clark.
 Bridge Real Ferdinando sul Garigliano (suspension, in the Kingdom of Naples), designed by Luigi Giura.
 George IV Bridge in Edinburgh, designed by Thomas Hamilton.
 Church of St Dunstan-in-the-West, Fleet Street, London, completed after the death in July of its designer John Shaw, Sr. by his son, John Shaw, Jr.
 Stirling New Bridge in Scotland, designed by Robert Stevenson, completed.

Awards
 Grand Prix de Rome, architecture: Jean-Arnoud Léveil.

Births
 March 23 – Charles Henry Driver, English architect (died 1900)
 March 29 – William Swinden Barber, English architect (died 1908)
 September 25 – William Le Baron Jenney, American architect (died 1907)
 October 10 – Henry Hunter, English-born architect working in Tasmania (died 1892)
 December 15 – Gustave Eiffel, French civil engineer (died 1923)
 December 22 – Henry Augustus Sims, American architect working in Philadelphia (died 1875)
 date unknown – Frederick Thomas Pilkington, English-born architect working in Scotland (died 1898)

Deaths
 June 4 – William Heste, Russian architect, civil engineer and town planner of Scottish descent
 July 30 – John Shaw, Sr., English architect (born 1776)
 September 22 – William Fowler, English architect and engraver (born 1761)
 November 19 – John Paterson, Scottish architect
 December 19 – Augustus Charles Pugin, French-born English architectural draughtsman (born 1762)

References

Architecture
Years in architecture
19th-century architecture